Sándor Réthy (15 November 1923 – 4 June 1998) was a Hungarian gymnast. He competed in eight events at the 1952 Summer Olympics.

References

1923 births
1998 deaths
Hungarian male artistic gymnasts
Olympic gymnasts of Hungary
Gymnasts at the 1952 Summer Olympics
Sportspeople from Debrecen